is the 12th single by Japanese singer Hiroko Moriguchi. Written by Yui Nishiwaki and Kaori Okui, the single was released on September 24, 1992 under King Records.

Background and release 
"Speed" was Moriguchi's first collaboration with Princess Princess lead vocalist/songwriter Kaori Okui. It was selected as the theme song of the "Super Kick Base" portion of the Fuji TV variety show Yume ga Mori Mori. Moriguchi performed the song on the 43rd Kōhaku Uta Gassen that year.

The B-side is "Mado Utsu Ame", which was later covered by Kaori Kishitani on her 2015 single "Dream".

The single peaked at No. 15 on Oricon's singles chart.

Track listing
All music is composed by Kaori Okui; all music is arranged by Kaori Okui and Nobuhiko Kashiwara, except where indicated.

Chart position

References

External links 
 
 

1992 singles
1992 songs
Hiroko Moriguchi songs
Japanese-language songs
Songs written by Kaori Kishitani
King Records (Japan) singles